Reign title may refer to:

Chinese era name
Japanese era name
Korean era name
Vietnamese era name